is a yakuza gang based in Kobe, Japan.  It was the largest affiliate, followed by the Nagoya-based Kodo-kai, of the largest known yakuza syndicate in Japan, the Yamaguchi-gumi until 2015. From 2015 to 2020, it was under the umbrella of the Kobe Yamaguchi-gumi. In July 2021, the group split from the Yamaguchi-gumi, with a large number of their members opting to stay with the Yamaguchi-gumi.

Before the split, the Yamaken-gumi was estimated to have between 3,000 and 7,000 members. Following the split the number dropped to around 800.

Yoshinori Watanabe was kumicho (Godfather) of the Yamaken-gumi from 1982 to 1989 before becoming kumicho of the Yamaguchi-gumi.  Watanabe retired from that post in July 2005, but the Yamaken-gumi remains largely loyal to him.  Many of its members were upset that the sixth Yamaguchi don was not chosen from their ranks, instead, the Nagoya-based Kenichi Shinoda was chosen.

The Yamaken-gumi's current president (kumicho) is Kunio Inoue (born 1948 in Oita, Kyushu). The number-two (wakagashira) is Kuniharu Yamamoto (born 1949 in Oita, Kyushu).

On 16 September 2021, the Yamaguchi-gumi announced that it will be welcoming back Yamaken-gumi members who had disunited from them in 2015.

Leadership
2nd kumicho (1982-1989):  who was wakagashira of the Fourth Yamaguchi-gumi.
He was kaicho of the Second Kenryu-kai.
He was kaicho of the Fourth Kenryu-kai. He is an adopted son of Kuwata.

Current Top Leaders
kumicho - Kunio Inoue
wakagashira - Hideyuki Senoo (kumicho of the Senoo-gumi)

References 

Organizations established in 1961
1961 establishments in Japan
Yakuza groups
Yamaguchi-gumi